Michéle Odette Clarke (born 15 July 1963) is a South African politician. A member of the Democratic Alliance, Clarke served as a councillor in the Ekurhuleni Metropolitan Municipality from 2004 until her election to the Gauteng Provincial Legislature as a DA representative in 2014. After serving one term in the provincial legislature, Clarke was elected to the National Assembly of South Africa in 2019. She currently serves as Shadow Minister of Health after previously serving as Shadow Deputy Minister of Public Service and Administration and as Shadow Deputy Minister of Public Enterprises.

Political career
Clarke joined the Democratic Party, the Democratic Alliance's predecessor, in 1997 and served as the chairperson of the party's branch in Bedfordview until 2000. Clarke soon became a member of the DA which was formed out of a merger of the DP and the New National Party in 2000. She was elected as the ward councillor for the Bedfordview Ward in the Ekurhuleni Metropolitan Municipality in a by-election in 2004. She was re-elected in 2006 and 2011. Clarke served as a whip and deputy chief whip of the DA caucus in the municipality.

Clarke was elected to the Gauteng Provincial Legislature at the provincial election held on 7 May 2014. She was sworn in as an MPL on 21 May 2014. She was assigned to the legislature's committees on community safety and education, and she was also appointed the party's spokesperson for community safety. Between November 2014 and November 2017, she served as deputy provincial chair of the party.

Parliamentary career
Prior to the 8 May 2019 general elections, she was placed 12th on the DA's regional list, 65th on the party's provincial list and 45th on the party's national list. Clarke was elected to the National Assembly and took office as a Member of Parliament on 22 May 2019. On 5 June 2019, the DA parliamentary leader, Mmusi Maimane, appointed her as Shadow Deputy Minister of Public Service and Administration. Clarke became a member of that specific portfolio's parliamentary committee on 27 June 2019.

On 5 December 2020, Clarke was appointed as Shadow Deputy Minister of Public Enterprises by John Steenhuisen. On 7 December, she left the  Portfolio Committee on Public Service and Administration, Performance Monitoring & Evaluation and became a member of the Portfolio Committee on Public Enterprises.

By February 2022, Clarke had been promoted to Shadow Minister of Health, succeeding Siviwe Gwarube, who left the position after she was elected deputy chief whip of the DA caucus in December 2021. She now serves on the Portfolio Committee on Health. Clarke is opposed to the National Health Insurance Bill which she has said will be "another SOE".

Personal life
Clarke lives in Germiston with her husband. She has two children, a daughter and a son. Clarke holds a paralegal certificate.

Her sister is Tania Campbell, who has been the Mayor of Ekurhuleni since November 2021, despite briefly being out of office in October 2022.

References

External links
Mrs Michéle Odette Clarke at Parliament of South Africa

Living people
1963 births
People from Gauteng
Politicians from Gauteng
Members of the Gauteng Provincial Legislature
Members of the National Assembly of South Africa
20th-century South African politicians
21st-century South African politicians
Democratic Alliance (South Africa) politicians
Women members of provincial legislatures of South Africa